Galarza is a surname of Basque origins.  Notable people with the surname include:

Adrián Salvador Galarza González (born 1965), Mexican politician
Alma Galarza, Puerto Rican singer
Ana Galarza (born 1989), Ecuadorian beauty pageant winner
Ángel Galarza (1892–1966), Spanish politician
Ernesto Galarza (1905–1984), Mexican-American labor activist
Jaime Galarza Zavala (born 1930), Ecuadorian writer, poet, journalist and politician
Kenny Galarza (born 1985), Puerto Rican boxer
Marcos Galarza (born 1984), Argentine footballer
Mariano Galarza (born 1986), Argentine rugby union player
Matías Galarza (footballer, born 2002)
Sergio Galarza (born 1975), Bolivian footballer
Valentín Galarza Morante (1882–1951), Spanish politician

References

Basque-language surnames